XHOZ-FM is a radio station in Querétaro, Querétaro. Broadcasting on 94.7 FM, XHOZ is owned by Grupo Imagen and carries its Imagen Radio network.

History
The concession was issued to René Olivares Gascón in 1982. It was sold to Impulsora de Radiodifusión, S.A., and then to Imagen.

References

Radio stations in Querétaro
Grupo Imagen